Logan County is a county in the U.S. state of West Virginia. As of the 2020 census, the population was 32,567. Its county seat is Logan.  Logan County comprises the Logan, WV Micropolitan Statistical Area, which is also included in the Charleston–Huntington–Ashland, WV–OH–KY Combined Statistical Area.

History
Logan County was formed in 1824 from parts of Giles, Tazewell, Cabell, and Kanawha counties, then part of the state of Virginia. It is named for Chief Logan, famous Native American chief of the Mingo tribe. Logan was one of fifty Virginia counties that became part of the new state of West Virginia in 1863, by an executive order of Abraham Lincoln during the Civil War, even though Logan Country had voted for secession in the April 4, 1861 convention.

Within months of its admission to the Union, West Virginia's counties were divided into civil townships, with the intention of encouraging local government.  This proved impractical in the heavily rural state, and in 1872 the townships were converted into magisterial districts. Logan County was divided into five districts: Chapmanville, Hardee, Logan, Magnolia, and Triadelphia.  A sixth district, Lee, was formed in 1878 from portions of Hardy and Magnolia Districts.  In 1895, Mingo County was formed from Hardee, Lee, and Magnolia Districts, along with portions of Chapmanville and Triadelphia Districts.

In the 1960s, Chapmanville District was discontinued, and two new districts, Guyan and Island Creek, formed from its territory, along with portions of Logan and Triadelphia Districts.  The county was redistricted again in the 1980s, resulting in nine magisterial districts: Buffalo, Chapmanville, East, Guyan, Island Creek, Logan, Northwest, Triadelphia, and West.  However, in the following decade these were consolidated into three districts: Central, Eastern, and Western.

In 1921 it was the location of the Battle of Blair Mountain, one of the largest armed uprisings in U.S. history. The communities of Lorado and Lundale were destroyed and 14 other communities heavily damaged, including Saunders, Amherstdale, Crites, and Latrobe.

Geography

Major highways
  (future)
  (future)
  U.S. Highway 52
  U.S. Highway 119
  West Virginia Route 10
  West Virginia Route 17
  West Virginia Route 44
  West Virginia Route 73
  West Virginia Route 80

Adjacent counties
 Lincoln County (north)
 Boone County (northeast)
 Wyoming County (southeast)
 Mingo County (southwest)

Demographics

2000 census
As of the census of 2000, there were 37,710 people, 14,880 households, and 10,936 families living in the county.  The population density was 83 people per square mile (32/km2).  There were 16,807 housing units at an average density of 37 per square mile (14/km2).  The racial makeup of the county was 96.33% White, 2.59% Black or African American, 0.12% Native American, 0.30% Asian, 0.02% Pacific Islander, 0.06% from other races, and 0.59% from two or more races.  0.54% of the population were Hispanic or Latino of any race.

There were 14,880 households, out of which 30.50% had children under the age of 18 living with them, 57.00% were married couples living together, 12.60% had a female householder with no husband present, and 26.50% were non-families. 24.00% of all households were made up of individuals, and 11.40% had someone living alone who was 65 years of age or older.  The average household size was 2.50 and the average family size was 2.95.

In the county, the population was spread out, with 22.10% under the age of 18, 9.30% from 18 to 24, 28.00% from 25 to 44, 26.10% from 45 to 64, and 14.50% who were 65 years of age or older.  The median age was 39 years. For every 100 females there were 94.20 males.  For every 100 females age 18 and over, there were 91.00 males.

The median income for a household in the county was $24,603, and the median income for a family was $29,072. Males had a median income of $31,515 versus $20,212 for females. The per capita income for the county was $14,102.  About 20.80% of families and 24.10% of the population were below the poverty line, including 34.60% of those under age 18 and 14.40% of those age 65 or over.

2010 census
As of the 2010 United States census, there were 36,743 people, 14,907 households, and 10,512 families living in the county. The racial makeup of the county was 96.5% white, 2.1% black or African American, 0.3% Asian, 0.1% American Indian, 0.1% from other races, and 0.8% from two or more races. Those of Hispanic or Latino origin made up 0.7% of the population. In terms of ancestry, 16.6% were Irish, 13.3% were German, 7.8% were English, and 6.9% were American.

Of the 14,907 households, 30.1% had children under the age of 18 living with them, 52.7% were married couples living together, 12.5% had a female householder with no husband present, 29.5% were non-families, and 26.1% of all households were made up of individuals. The average household size was 2.43 and the average family size was 2.90. The median age was 42.4 years.

The median income for a household in the county was $35,465 and the median income for a family was $43,475. Males had a median income of $39,462 versus $26,571 for females. The per capita income for the county was $18,614. About 17.6% of families and 21.8% of the population were below the poverty line, including 32.8% of those under age 18 and 7.4% of those age 65 or over.

Politics
Logan County, being historically secessionist and between the New Deal and the 1990s heavily unionized, was once powerfully Democratic. Before the 2008 election, the only Republican to carry the county had been Herbert Hoover in 1928, due to strong anti-Catholicism against Al Smith in this "Bible Belt" region. Logan was the only county in West Virginia to be carried by George McGovern in his lackluster 1972 campaign, and between 1976 and 2000 no Republican reached 40 percent of the county's vote. Over the past three presidential elections swings to the Republican Party have averaged thirty percentage points and Democratic vote percentages have plummeted to levels historically more typical of unionist, traditionally Republican counties like Grant.

Communities

Incorporated communities
 Logan (county seat)
 Chapmanville
 Man
 Mitchell Heights
 West Logan

Magisterial districts
 Central
 Eastern
 Western

Census-designated places

 Accoville
 Amherstdale
 Big Creek
 Bruno
 Chauncey
 Crooked Creek
 Earling
 Greenville
 Henlawson
 Holden
 Justice Addition
 Kistler
 Mallory
 McConnell
 Monaville
 Mount Gay-Shamrock
 Neibert
 Omar
 Peach Creek
 Robinette
 Rossmore
 Sarah Ann
 Stollings
 Switzer
 Verdunville

Unincorporated communities

 Argyle
 Baber
 Baisden
 Banco
 Barnabus
 Becco
 Beebe
 Black Bottom
 Blair
 Bradshaw
 Braeholm
 Chambers
 Christian
 Claypool
 Coal Valley
 Cora
 Craneco
 Crites
 Crown
 Crystal Block
 Dabney
 Daisy
 Davin
 Davis
 Dehue
 Diamond
 Dobra
 Dog Patch
 Don
 Emmett
 Ethel
 Fanco
 Five Block
 Fort Branch
 Freeze Fork
 Frogtown
 Gillman Bottom
 Godby Heights
 Guyan Terrace
 Halcyon
 Hedgeview
 Hensley Heights
 Hetzel
 Huff Junction
 Hutchinson
 Isom
 Kelly
 Kitchen
 Lake
 Landville
 Latrobe
 Lintz Addition
 Logan Heights
 Lorado
 Lundale
 Lyburn
 Melville
 Micco
 Mifflin
 Mineral City
 Monclo
 Monitor
 Mountain View
 Oilville
 Orville
 Pardee
 Pecks Mill
 Phico
 Pine Creek
 Ralumco
 Red Campbell
 Ridgeview
 Rita
 Rum Junction
 Saunders
 Sharples
 Shegon
 Shively
 Slagle
 Sodom
 Sovereign
 Spruce Valley
 Stirrat
 Stone Branch
 Stowe
 Sulphur Springs
 Sunbeam
 Sunset Court
 Superior Bottom
 Sycamore
 Taplin
 Thompson Town
 Trace Junction
 Troy Town
 Upper Whitman
 Verner
 Walnut Hill
 Wanda
 Whirlwind
 Whites Addition
 Whitman
 Whitman Junction
 Wilkinson
 Wylo
 Yolyn

School districts
 Logan County Schools (consolidated, county-wide)

See also
 Aracoma Alma Mine accident
 Buffalo Creek flood
 Chief Logan State Park
 Elk Creek Wildlife Management Area
 James H. Harless
 Landau Eugene Murphy Jr.
 Logan (Iroquois leader)
 National Register of Historic Places listings in Logan County, West Virginia
 Political scandals in Logan County, West Virginia

Footnotes

References

External links
 Earl Dotter, "Coalfield Generations: Health, Mining, and the Environment," Southern Spaces 16 July 2008. http://southernspaces.org/2008/coalfield-generations-health-mining-and-environment
 Logan County Chamber of Commerce
 Logan County Schools
 Logan County WVGenWeb
 Logan Coalfield
 The Logan Banner - daily newspaper.
 Blair Community Center and Museum to visit a museum focused on the largest labor battle in the United States as well as the heritage of local coal-mining communities.

 
1824 establishments in Virginia
Populated places established in 1824
Counties of Appalachia